Linda Jeanne Bement (November 2, 1941 – March 19, 2018) was an American model and beauty queen who became the third Miss USA to be crowned Miss Universe. She died of natural causes on March 19, 2018, at her home in Salt Lake City.

Miss Universe 1960
A member of the Church of Jesus Christ of Latter-day Saints, Bement was the second woman from Utah to be crowned Miss USA. She represented the United States in the Miss Universe 1960 pageant, broadcast from Miami Beach, Florida, where she was crowned the winner of the title by Miss Universe 1959, Akiko Kojima of Japan. The 1960 pageant was the first Miss Universe pageant to be televised nationwide.

Life after Miss Universe
In 1962, she married the Panamanian-born future U.S. Racing Hall of Fame Thoroughbred racing jockey, Manuel Ycaza. The couple had two children before they divorced in November 1969. Linda died of natural causes on March 19, 2018, at her home in Salt Lake City.

References

External links
 Official Miss Universe website - Past titleholders

1941 births
2018 deaths
Latter Day Saints from Utah
Miss Universe 1960 contestants
Miss Universe winners
Miss USA 1960s delegates
Miss USA winners
People from Salt Lake City
20th-century American women